Mustapha Bangura (born 24 October 1989 in Freetown, Sierra Leone) is a Sierra Leonean footballer who plays as an attacking midfielder for AEZ Zakakiou.

Career

Club
In 2005, he joined Old Edwardians in the Sierra Leone National Premier League. He spent a season with Edwards before he moved to Europe and joined the Cyprus First Division club Nea Salamina FC in 2006. In 2008, he joined AC Omonoia. The next year he moved to Apollon Limassol and he helped the team to win the 2009–10 Cypriot Cup, scoring also the opening goal of the final. In 2012, he joined AEK on a 2-year deal. In 2014 with joined Nikos & Socratis Erimis Fc. In the summer of 2015, Bangura joined newly promoted Aris Limassol FC. Mustapha 'Haji' Bangura is the second Sierra Leonean player to sign for Aris Limassol after Gibrilla Julius Wobay who joined them on a season loan from Romanian side Universita Craiova.

On 19 February 2016, last day of the Serbian winter transfer window, Bangura signed with FK Borac Čačak, at time a second-placed club at half-season of the 2015–16 Serbian SuperLiga. He thus became the fourth Sierra Leonean to play in the Serbian highest level after Kelfala Marah, Medo and Lamin Suma. On 11 March, in the round 26 of the SuperLiga, Bangura scored his first goal with a header in the 91st minute of the game against Vojvodina. His goal secured Borac a last minutes draw against a direct opponent in the league. Next summer he moved to the Serbian First League club Zemun, but after he made 6 appearances in both domestic competitions, he was suspended by the club and missed to play any official match for the rest of season. In September 2017, Bangura signed with the Greek side Rodos.

International
On 14 November 2014 he scored a goal against Côte d'Ivoire.

Personal life 
On 24 May 2011 Mustapha Bangura was involved in a car crash together with his cousin Ibraheem Wahid Sillah. He returned in full action in November 2011 for Apollon Limassol.

Honours
Apollon

Cypriot Cup: 2009–10, Winner, Scored in Cup Final the first goal in the win 2–1 against APOEL
Cypriot Cup: 2010–11, Runner up, Lost in penalty shoot out, Scored 5 goals in 5 games out 7 in total games including the Final.

References

External links
 

1989 births
Living people
Association football midfielders
Sierra Leonean footballers
Sierra Leonean expatriate footballers
Cypriot First Division players
Cypriot Second Division players
Nea Salamis Famagusta FC players
AC Omonia players
AEP Paphos FC players
Apollon Limassol FC players
Expatriate footballers in Cyprus
AEK Larnaca FC players
Sierra Leone international footballers
FK Borac Čačak players
FK Zemun players
Rodos F.C. players
Episkopi F.C. players
AEZ Zakakiou players
Serbian First League players
Serbian SuperLiga players
Expatriate footballers in Serbia
Temne people
Sportspeople from Freetown